Pingfang Area is an area and township on the eastern part of Chaoyang District, Beijing, China. It borders Dongba and Changying Townships to the north, Changying Township to the east, Sanjianfang and Gaobeidian Townships to the south,  Balizhuang and Liulitun Subdistricts as well as Dongfeng Township to the west. In 2020, it has a total population of 85,581.

The subdistrict was named after Pingfang Village within the area.

History

Administrative Divisions 
In the year 2021, Pingfang Township has 18 subdivisions, in which 14 are communities and 4 are villages:

See also 
 List of township-level divisions of Beijing

References

Chaoyang District, Beijing
Areas of Beijing